Magic: The Very Best of Olivia Newton-John is a 2001 greatest hits compilation from Olivia Newton-John. This was the first compilation from Newton-John to include all 15 of her Top 10 hits on the Billboard Hot 100 and the first Newton-John album to include "The Grease Megamix".

Reception 

Stephen Thomas Erlewine of AllMusic felt Magic: The Very Best of Olivia Newton-John is "the best compilation ever assembled on Newton-John's career, largely because it does cover her entire career, hitting every major point."

Track listing 

"Let Me Be There" (John Rostill) - 2:58
"If You Love Me (Let Me Know)" (Rostill) - 3:12
"I Honestly Love You" (Peter Allen, Jeff Barry) - 3:37
"Have You Never Been Mellow" (John Farrar) - 3:31
"Please Mr. Please" (Bruce Welch, Rostill) - 3:23
"Come On Over" (Barry Gibb, Robin Gibb) - 3:41
"Don't Stop Believin'" (Farrar) - 3:37
"Sam" (Farrar, Hank Marvin, Don Black) - 3:43
"You're the One That I Want" (Farrar) - 2:49, duet with John Travolta
"Hopelessly Devoted To You" (Farrar) - 3:06
"Summer Nights" (Jim Jacobs, Warren Casey) - 3:36, duet with Travolta
Tracks 9-11 are originally from the 1978 film Grease
"A Little More Love" (Farrar) - 3:28
"Deeper Than the Night" (Tom Snow, Johnny Vastano) - 3:37
"Magic" (Farrar) - 4:30
"Xanadu" (Jeff Lynne) - 3:29, with Electric Light Orchestra
"Suddenly" (Farrar) - 4:01, duet with Cliff Richard
Tracks 14-16 are originally from the 1980 film Xanadu
"Physical" (Steve Kipner, Terry Shaddick) - 3:43
"Make a Move on Me" (Farrar, Snow) - 3:16
"Heart Attack" (Kipner, Paul Bliss) - 3:07
"Twist of Fate" (Kipner, Peter Beckett) - 3:38
"The Grease Megamix" (Farrar, Jacobs, Casey) - 4:50, duet with Travolta
All tracks produced by John Farrar, except "Xanadu" produced by Jeff Lynne and "Twist of Fate" produced by David Foster.

Charts

References 

2001 greatest hits albums
Albums produced by David Foster
Albums produced by Jeff Lynne
Albums produced by John Farrar
Olivia Newton-John compilation albums